The Day Has Come is the debut and only studio album singer-songwriter/guitarist Cheyenne Kimball. The lead single from the album, "Hanging On", peaked at number 53 on the Billboard Hot 100. The album was released on July 11, 2006. Kimball co-wrote all the songs featured on the album. The album debuted at #15 on the Billboard 200 selling 40,000 copies in the first week. Miley Cyrus covered the song "Four Walls" on her second studio album Breakout (2008).

Track listing
 "Intro" (Eddie Head, Cheyenne Kimball) – 0:51
 "I Want To" (Kara DioGuardi, Kimball, Greg Wells) – 3:36
 "Hanging On" (Kimball, Chantal Kreviazuk, Raine Maida) – 4:09
 "One Original Thing" (Kimball, Billy Mann) – 3:32
 "The Day Has Come" (Scott Cutler, Kimball, Anne Preven) – 3:21
 "Four Walls" (Cutler, Kimball, Preven) – 3:28
 "Hello Goodbye" (DioGuardi, Kimball, Wells) – 2:40
 "Good Go Bad" (Kimball, Brad Smith, Christopher Thorne) – 3:38
 "Everything to Lose" (Kimball, Smith, Thorn) – 3:41
 "Breaking Your Heart" (Kimball, Vicky McGehee, John Rich) – 4:00
 "Mr. Beautiful" (Kimball, Kreviazuk, Maida) – 2:58
 "Didn't I" (Kevin Griffin, Kimball) – 3:46
 "Full Circle" (Kimball, Mann) – 2:53
 "Drift Away" (Griffin, Kimball) - 4:08 [iTunes Bonus Track]

Chart performance

Singles

References

2006 debut albums
Cheyenne Kimball albums
Albums produced by Greg Wells
Albums produced by Raine Maida
Epic Records albums
Daylight Records albums